The William–Oliver Building is a 1930 Art Deco landmark building at 32 Peachtree Street NW at Five Points, Downtown Atlanta. It currently consists of 115 apartments. Its architect was Francis Palmer Smith of Pringle and Smith and was Atlanta's first completed Art Deco skyscraper. It was named after developer Thomas G. Healey's grandsons William and Oliver.

References

Residential skyscrapers in Atlanta
Buildings and structures completed in 1930
Pringle and Smith buildings
Art Deco architecture in Georgia (U.S. state)